Anees Salim is an Indian author known for his books like Vanity Bagh, The Blind Lady's Descendants and the Small Town Sea. He is from the town of Varkala, and now lives in Kochi, Kerala. He won the Sahitya Akademi Award for The Blind Lady's Descendants in 2018, becoming only the fourth Malayalee in history to win the award for an English work. Some of his columns have appeared in newspaper The Indian Express.

Life and career
Anees Salim was born in Varkala, a small town in Kerala, in 1970. In an interview to The Hindu, Salim says he inherited his love for words from his father who used to work in West Asia. Salim is the Creative Director for FCB Ulka, the multi-national advertising firm, and lives in Kochi. Despite his background in PR and advertising, Salim makes a point of avoiding promotional tours and speaking at literary festivals.

In an interview to the Earthen Lamp Journal, Salim talks about how his first two novels were rejected by publishers. It was his third book, Tales from a Vending Machine, that helped his career as a writer take off. Sold to a publisher within a week, it renewed interest in his other works and, as Salim says, "fetched me four book deals."

Awards and honours
2013 - The Hindu Literary Prize for Vanity Bagh. The prize was announced by novelist Jim Crace in the valedictory function of the Hindu Lit for Life festival held in Chennai during 12–14 January 2014.
2015 - Crossword Book Award in Indian Fiction for The Blind Lady’s Descendants
2017 - Bangalore Atta Galatta Literature Book Festival's Best Fiction (English) for The Small Town Sea
2017 - The Hindu Prize shortlist for the Small Town Sea
2017 - Tata Literature Live! Book of the Year Award (Fiction) shortlist for the Small Town Sea
2018 - Sahitya Akademi Award (English category), for The Blind Lady's Descendants
 2022 - JCB Longlist for The Odd Book of Baby Names
 2022 - Atta Galatta-Bangalore Literature Festival Longlist for The Odd Book of Baby Names
 2022 - Valley of Words Best Book Award for The Odd Book of Baby Names

Works
The Vicks Mango Tree (2012) Harper Collins
Tales From A Vending Machine (2013) Harper Collins
Vanity Bagh (2013) Picador
The Blind Lady’s Descendants (2014) Penguin 
The Small-Town Sea (2017) Penguin Hamish Hamilton 
The Odd Book of Baby Names (2021) Penguin Hamish Hamilton
 The Bellboy(2022) Penguin Hamish Hamilton & Holland House

References

 15.https://thewire.in/books/interview-anees-salim-religious-polarisation-family-dynamics
 16.https://scroll.in/article/1015654/i-dont-see-death-as-the-end-but-the-beginning-writer-anees-salim

 17.https://www.hindustantimes.com/books/interview-anees-salim-author-of-the-odd-book-of-baby-names-humour-runs-on-a-parallel-track-101641566450475.html
 18. https://www.thehindu.com/books/books-can-talk-for-the-author-anees-salim/article38272851.ece
 19. https://www.newindianexpress.com/lifestyle/books/2021/dec/12/i-write-to-calm-myself-down-2393968.html
 20. https://thepunchmagazine.com/the-byword/interviews/anees-salim-amp-lsquo-surrounded-by-people-we-mimic-normalcy-in-private-we-are-all-oddballs-amp-rsquo
 21. https://www.theweek.in/theweek/leisure/2022/09/17/anees-salim-returns-to-his-obsession-with-death-in-his-new-book.html
 22. https://www.grazia.co.in/lifestyle/culture/anees-salim-gets-candid-about-his-coming-of-age-novel-by-the-sea-9933.html
 23. https://openthemagazine.com/lounge/books/anees-salim-the-heirs-of-the-king/
 24. https://caravanmagazine.in/tag/anees-salim
 25. https://dailygoodmorningkashmir.com/anees-salim-a-muslim-star-on-indian-literary-firmament/
 26. https://www.platform-mag.com/literature/anees-salim.html
 27. https://bombaylitmag.com/anees-salim-interviewed-by-tblm-staff/
 28. https://www.mid-day.com/mumbai-guide/famous-personalities/article/the-curious-case-of-anees-salim-16233196
 29. https://www.business-standard.com/article/beyond-business/i-m-brimming-with-sadness-writing-alleviates-pain-novelist-anees-salim-118122900579_1.html
 30. https://www.forbesindia.com/article/think/labels-and-rebels-in-anees-salims-novels/40437/1
 31. https://www.deccanchronicle.com/sunday-chronicle/shelf-life/020717/i-like-to-keep-my-world-small-and-quiet-says-anees-salim.html
 32. https://www.firstpost.com/living/sahitya-akademi-winner-anees-salim-on-staying-away-from-public-eye-value-of-awards-and-solitude-5790701.html
 33. https://www.asianage.com/age-on-sunday/030219/small-town-tales.html
 34. https://www.khaleejtimes.com/wknd/i-always-wanted-to-be-invisible-anees-salim
 35. https://www.readersdigest.in/culturescape/story-anees-salims-list-of-favourites-124631
 36. https://www.worldliteraturetoday.org/blog/book-reviews/coming-age-story-muslim-boy-wins-indias-highest-literary-prize-leeya-mehta

External links
Anees Salim's page on his publisher's site
An interview in Business World
 Interview at Earthen Lamp Journal https://web.archive.org/web/20180910183931/http://www.earthenlampjournal.com/issue5/interview.php?interview_id=8
 Review of The Blind Lady's Descendants by Suneetha Balakrishnan https://web.archive.org/web/20180910183545/http://www.earthenlampjournal.com/issue5/bookreview.php?review_id=19
 Review of Vanity Bagh by Suneetha Balakrishnan http://www.thehindu.com/books/books-reviews/garden-of-good-and-evil/article5204205.ece

Indian male novelists
Writers from Kochi
Indian advertising people
Living people
Year of birth missing (living people)
People from Varkala
Recipients of the Sahitya Akademi Award in English
 https://scroll.in/article/1015654/i-dont-see-death-as-the-end-but-the-beginning-writer-anees-salim
 https://thewire.in/books/interview-anees-salim-religious-polarisation-family-dynamics